The Neighborhood House, located in southwest Portland, Oregon, is listed on the National Register of Historic Places.

See also
 National Register of Historic Places listings in Southwest Portland, Oregon

References

1910 establishments in Oregon
A. E. Doyle buildings
Colonial Revival architecture in Oregon
Georgian Revival architecture in Oregon
Houses completed in 1910
Houses on the National Register of Historic Places in Portland, Oregon
Individually listed contributing properties to historic districts on the National Register in Oregon
Portland Historic Landmarks
Southwest Portland, Oregon